Timothy James Brauteseth is a South African forensic investigator and Democratic Alliance politician from KwaZulu-Natal who has served as a permanent delegate to the National Council of Provinces since May 2019. Brauteseth was a Member of the National Assembly from May 2014 until May 2019.

Career
Brauteseth worked as a forensic investigator before becoming active in politics.

National Assembly
In 2014, he was elected to the National Assembly of South Africa as a member of the Democratic Alliance.

He sat on the Standing Committee on Public Accounts (SCOPA) from 20 June 2014 to 7 May 2019.

National Council of Provinces
After the 2019 general election, Brauteseth was elected as a permanent delegate to the National Council of Provinces from KwaZulu-Natal. He was sworn into the NCOP on 23 May 2019.

Committee assignments
Joint Standing Committee on Financial Management of Parliament
Select Committee on Transport, Public Service and Administration, Public Works and Infrastructure
Select Committee on Trade and Industry, Economic Development, Small Business Development, Tourism, Employment and Labour

References

Living people
Year of birth missing (living people)
White South African people
People from KwaZulu-Natal
Democratic Alliance (South Africa) politicians
Members of the National Assembly of South Africa
Members of the National Council of Provinces